Chandragiri Cable Car is a gondola lift transportation system located in Chandragiri Municipality, Nepal. Opened in 2016, the Chandragiri Cable Car runs from Thankot to Chandragiri hills. The 2.4km (9,095ft) line has two stations. The cable car system consists of 38 gondolas that can carry 1,000 people per hour. Bhaleshwor Mahadev temple is situated at the top of Chandragiri hills.

The 2.4 km cable car ride takes 9 minutes to reach the Chandragiri Hills’ top station. A cabin accommodates 8 passengers. A child above 3 feet of height requires a ticket.

Ticket rates

See also
Manakamana Cable Car
List of gondola lifts

References

External links
Official Website

Gondala lifts in Nepal
Kathmandu District
2016 establishments in Nepal